Paladin II is a video game developed by Omnitrend Software and published by Impressions Games in 1992 for MS-DOS, Amiga, and Atari ST.

Plot
Paladin II is a strategy fantasy adventure game that features a point-and-drag interface. The game allows a player to import characters from Breach.  The game features scenarios that vary in difficulty from easy to very hard, and the game includes an editor that allows a player to create new scenarios.

Reception
The game was reviewed in 1993 in Dragon #193 by Hartley, Patricia, and Kirk Lesser in "The Role of Computers" column. The reviewers gave the game 2 out of 5 stars.

Reviews
Atari ST User - Dec, 1992
ST Format - Jan, 1993
Amiga Games - Nov, 1991
PC Games (Germany) - Nov, 1992
ASM (Aktueller Software Markt) - Nov, 1992
Computer Gaming World - Mar, 1993

References

External links

Paladin II at GameSpot

1992 video games
Amiga games
Atari ST games
DOS games
Impressions Games games
Single-player video games
Video game sequels
Video games developed in the United States